Vasja Rupnik (born June 6, 1977 in Ljubljana, Slovenia) is a Slovenian biathlete.

Rupnik represented Slovenia at the 2010 Winter Olympics.

References

1977 births
Living people
Slovenian male biathletes
Biathletes at the 2010 Winter Olympics
Olympic biathletes of Slovenia
Sportspeople from Ljubljana